Flavine Mawete Musolo (born 11 December 2000), known as Flavine Mawete, is a DR Congolese footballer who plays as a winger for Adana İdmanyurduspor in the Turkish Women's Super League and the DR Congo women's national team.

Club career
Mawete has played for FC Attaque Sans Recul (ASR) in the Democratic Republic of the Congo and for Simba in Tanzania.

In 2021, she moved to Turkey to join the Turkish Women's Super League club Adana İdmanyurduspor.

International career
Mawete capped for the DR Congo at senior level during the 2020 CAF Women's Olympic Qualifying Tournament (third round).

See also
 List of Democratic Republic of the Congo women's international footballers

References

External links

2000 births
Living people
Footballers from Kinshasa
Democratic Republic of the Congo women's footballers
Women's association football wingers
Adana İdmanyurduspor players
Turkish Women's Football Super League players
Democratic Republic of the Congo women's international footballers
Democratic Republic of the Congo expatriate footballers
Democratic Republic of the Congo expatriate sportspeople in Tanzania
Expatriate women's footballers in Tanzania
Democratic Republic of the Congo expatriate sportspeople in Turkey
Expatriate women's footballers in Turkey
21st-century Democratic Republic of the Congo people